New Adventures of Get Rich Quick Wallingford is a 1931 American pre-Code crime / romantic comedy film directed by Sam Wood and starring William Haines as a con artist and Jimmy Durante as his pickpocket buddy. The film is based on a series of stories by George Randolph Chester published in Cosmopolitan.

Plot

Cast
William Haines as Jimmy Wallingford
Jimmy Durante as Clarence 'Schnozzle'
Ernest Torrence as Blackie Daw
Leila Hyams as Dorothy Layton
Guy Kibbee as Police Sergeant McGonigal
Hale Hamilton as Charles Harper
Robert McWade as Horace Tuttle
Clara Blandick as Mrs Maggie Layton
Walter Walker as Frank Layton
Alfred Allen as Ship's Captain (uncredited)
Henry Armetta as Henry, a Barber (uncredited)
Lucy Beaumont as Mrs. Dalrymple, a Cleaning Lady (uncredited)
Robert Bolder as Minor Role (uncredited)
Sidney Bracey as Joe the Waiter (uncredited)
Allan Cavan as Hotel Cashier (uncredited)
Sydney Jarvis as Chief of Police Morgan (uncredited)
Tom Kennedy as Truck Driver (uncredited)
Edwin Maxwell as Adam Carver the Hotel Manager (uncredited)
Charles R. Moore as Bootblack (uncredited)
William H. O'Brien as Private Dining Room Waiter (uncredited)
Joe Sawyer as Willis the Newspaper Reporter (uncredited)
Rolfe Sedan as Barber (uncredited)
Phillips Smalley as Stockholder (uncredited)

Reception
Mordaunt Hall wrote in The New York Times that "the film affords many a good laugh and most of the ideas are developed quite neatly" and that Haines' performance was "emphatically satisfactory."

References

External links

1931 films
1931 romantic comedy films
American black-and-white films
Films based on short fiction
Films directed by Sam Wood
Metro-Goldwyn-Mayer films
1930s crime comedy films
American romantic comedy films
Films with screenplays by Charles MacArthur
American crime comedy films
1930s American films